Charles Gordon Smyth (17 April 1883 – 17 November 1927) was a notable New Zealand policeman, trade unionist and baker. He was born in Oamaru, North Otago, New Zealand in 1883.

References

1883 births
1927 deaths
New Zealand police officers
People from Oamaru
New Zealand trade unionists